The Saint-Cricq High School, known in French as Lycée Saint-Cricq is a public High school in Pau, Pyrénées-Atlantiques, France.

There are 1600 students. The pupils are 15 to 18 years old for preparing to take the baccalauréat and 18 to 20 years old for doing a post baccalauréat formation. The  is Michel Sieper.

See also
 Education in France
 Lycée Henri-IV
 Lycée Janson de Sailly
 Secondary education in France

Gallery

External links
 Official website
 Results for Saint-Cricq High School
 Saint-Cricq High School historical building on google street view

References

Saint-Cricq